The Archdeacon of Dromore is a senior ecclesiastical officer within the Anglican Diocese of Down and Dromore. The Archdeacon is responsible for the disciplinary supervision of clergy within the Diocese.

History
The archdeaconry can trace its history back to Tomas O'Mostead who held the office from 1406 to 1413. The current incumbent is Roderic West. In between, many of them went on to higher office:
 Thomas Bayly
 Theophilus Campbell 
 David Chillingworth (Bishop of St Andrews, Dunkeld and Dunblane, 2004–2017)
 Samuel Crooks (Dean of Belfast, 1970–1985)
 Ken Good (Bishop of Derry and Raphoe, 2002–2019)
 William Kerr (Bishop of Down and Dromore, 1944–1955)
 Francis Marsh
 Jack Shearer (Dean of Belfast, 1985–2001)
 Patrick Sheridan (Bishop of Cloyne, 1679–1682)

See also
 Clanwilliam Earldom
 Freeman Wills Crofts
 John Meade, 1st Earl of Clanwilliam
 James Saurin

References

 
Lists of Anglican archdeacons in Ireland
Diocese of Down and Dromore
Religion in Northern Ireland